How Does It End is an album by Australian singer/songwriter Tim Steward. It won Best Album of 2006 from Fasterlouder.com.au.

Track listing
before
not the same
remember what came first
law for yourself
the sun is beginning to rise
maybe
what are you doing to me?
i can't wait that long
the difference
sign from a star
Sunday morning

Sources 
Tim Steward Album

2006 albums